Pro Evolution Soccer, often abbreviated as PES and also known as World Soccer: Winning Eleven 5 in Japan, is a football sports simulation video game released in 2001. It is the first installment of Konami's Pro Evolution Soccer series.

World Soccer: Winning Eleven 5 Final Evolution was also released in Japan after the release of Pro Evolution Soccer in Europe. PES was succeeded by Pro Evolution Soccer 2, which was released in 2002.

In-game content
In the English version of the game, Chris James and Terry Butcher provide commentary on the matches, while in the Japanese version the commentators are Jon Kabira and Katsuyoshi Shinto.

Reception

Metacritic, which assigns a normalised rating in the 0–100 range, calculated an average score of 93 out of 100 ("Universal acclaim/Must-Play") for the PlayStation 2 version. Japanese gaming magazine Famicom Tsūshin scored both the original and J.League versions a score of 34 out of 40 (85 out of 100 for online version), while the Final Evolution version received a lower score (33 out of 40 printed, 83 out of 100 online), all on the same console version.

According to Famicom Tsūshin, Winning Eleven 5 for the PlayStation 2 sold a total of 505,694 copies, the Final Evolution version sold 315,732 copies, while the J.League versions sold 77,225 copies by the end of 2001. In the United Kingdom, the PlayStation 2 version of Pro Evolution Soccer received a "Gold" sales award from the Entertainment and Leisure Software Publishers Association (ELSPA), indicating sales of at least 200,000 copies in the United Kingdom. Pro Evolution Soccer was the 26th best-selling game of 2001 in the United Kingdom.

References

External links 

2001 video games
Association football video games
Golden Joystick Award winners
PlayStation (console) games
PlayStation 2 games
1
Video games developed in Japan
Video games scored by Michiru Yamane